Joachim Christensen (born November 7, 1978) is a retired Danish mixed martial artist. He was the Superior Challenge light heavyweight champion, as well as the German Mixed Martial Arts Championship (GMC) light heavyweight champion.  He  also competed in the  light heavyweight division of the Ultimate Fighting Championship (UFC). He currently signed to  Absolute Championship Berkut (ACB).

Background

Christensen was born and raised in Copenhagen, Denmark. He worked as a social worker and served in the Denmark Army prior fighting professionally.

Mixed martial arts career

Early career 
Christensen fought in European fight circuit and Middle East MMA promotions such as Adrenaline, Fighter Gala and  Royal Arena promotions, Hard Fighting Championship, Cage, European MMA, Superior Challenge, German MMA, Abu Dhabi Warriors and M1 Challenge prior joining UFC. He was the Scandinavian and  European C-Shoto champion.

Ultimate Fighting Championship 
After being one of the top ranked light heavyweight fighter in Europe, Christensen was signed by UFC on late 2016 at the age of 37. Christensen amassed a record of 14-3-0 prior signed by Ultimate Fighting Championship (UFC).

2016 
Christensen made his promotional debut at October 1, 2016 at UFC Fight Night: Lineker vs. Dodson. He lost the fight to Henrique da Silva after da Silva locked an arm bar and submitted him.

2017 
Christensen next faced Bojan Mihajlović at UFC Fight Night: Rodríguez vs. Penn on January 17, 2017. He won the fight after threw an upper cut and knocked out Mihajlović on round three.

On May 13, 2017, Christensen faced Gadzhimurad Antigulov at UFC 211.  He lost the fight via rear-naked choke on round one.

Christensen was expected to face promotional newcomer Azamat Murzakanov on June 25, 2017 at UFC Fight Night: Chiesa vs. Lee. However, Murzakanov was removed from the fight for undisclosed reasons and replaced by Dominick Reyes. Christensen lost the fight via TKO on round one.

Absolute Championship Berkut 
Christensen joined Absolute Championship Berkut (ABC) and his debut was on November 24, 2017 at  ACB 75: Gadzhidaudov vs. Zieliński against Döwletjan Ýaşgymyradow from Turkmenistan. He lost the fight on round one via knock out.

Return To German MMA Championship

After a one fight stint in ACB, Christensen returned to the GMC and faced Stephan Puetz for the GMC light heavyweight championship on March 23, 2019 at GMC 19 in Munich, Germany. He lost the fight via submission in the second round.

European circuit

Christensen faced Miloš Petrášek at Oktagon 15 on November 9, 2019. He won the fight via majority decision.

Christensen was scheduled to face Łukasz Sudolski at Babilon MMA 20 on March 26, 2021. He pulled out of the bout after falling sick the day of the bout. 

Christensen faced Evgeniy Erokhin at an Parus FC event on November 6, 2021. He lost the bout via ground and pound in the first round.

Championships and accomplishments

Mixed martial arts
Superior Challenge 
 Light Heavyweight Champion (One times) vs. Matti Makela
 One successful title defense vs. Max Nunes
German MMA Championship 
 Won the German MMA Championship Light Heavyweight title (One time) vs. Jonas Billstein

Mixed martial arts record

|-
| Loss
| align=center| 15–9
| Evgeny Erokhin
| TKO (punches)
| MFP Parus Fight Championship
| 
| align=center| 1
| align=center| 4:34
| Dubai, United Arab Emirates
| 
|-
|Win
|align=center|15–8
|Miloš Petrášek
|Decision (majority)
|Oktagon 15
|
|align=center|3
|align=center|5:00
|Prague, Czech Republic
|
|-
|Loss
|align=center|14–8
|Stephan Puetz
|Submission (arm-triangle choke)
|German MMA Championship 19
|
|align=center|2
|align=center|4:50
|Munich, Germany
|
|-
|Loss
|align=center|14–7
|Döwletjan Ýagşymyradow
|KO (punches)
|ACB 75: Gadzhidaudov vs. Zieliński
|
|align=center|1
|align=center|1:14
|Stuttgart, Germany
|
|-
|Loss
|align=center|14–6
|Dominick Reyes
|TKO (punches)
|UFC Fight Night: Chiesa vs. Lee
|
|align=center|1
|align=center|0:29
|Oklahoma City, Oklahoma, United States
|
|-
| Loss
| align=center| 14–5
| Gadzhimurad Antigulov
| Submission (rear-naked choke)
| UFC 211
| 
| align=center| 1
| align=center| 2:21
| Dallas, Texas, United States
|
|-
| Win
| align=center| 14–4
| Bojan Mihajlović
| TKO (punches)
| UFC Fight Night: Rodríguez vs. Penn
| 
| align=center| 3
| align=center| 2:05
| Phoenix, Arizona, United States
|
|-
| Loss
| align=center| 13–4
| Henrique da Silva
| Submission (armbar)
| UFC Fight Night: Lineker vs. Dodson
| 
| align=center| 2
| align=center| 4:47
| Portland, Oregon, United States
|
|-
| Win
| align=center| 13–3
| Anthony Ruiz
| Submission (armbar)
| Abu Dhabi Warriors 4
| 
| align=center| 1
| align=center| 4:47
| Abu Dhabi, United Arab Emirates
|
|-
| Win
| align=center| 12–3
| Jonas Billstein
| TKO (punches)
| German MMA Championship 7
| 
| align=center| 1
| align=center| 0:59
| Castrop-Rauxel, Germany
|  
|-
| Win
| align=center| 11–3
| Max Nunes
| Decision (split)
| Superior Challenge 12
| 
| align=center| 3
| align=center| 5:00
| Malmö, Sweden
|  
|-
| Win
| align=center| 10–3
| Matti Makela
| Decision (Split)
| Superior Challenge 10
| 
| align=center| 3
| align=center| 5:00
| Helsingborg, Sweden
| 
|-
| Win
| align=center| 9–3
| Stephan Puetz
| Decision (Split)
| European MMA 8
| 
| align=center| 3
| align=center| 5:00
| Hovedstaden, Denmark
|
|-
| Loss
| align=center| 8–3
| Marcus Vänttinen
| Decision (Split)
| Cage 23
| 
| align=center| 3
| align=center| 5:00
| Vantaa, Finland
|
|-
| Win
| align=center| 8–2
| Matti Makela
| Decision (unanimous)
| Royal Arena 2
| 
| align=center| 3
| align=center| 5:00
| Copenhagen, Denmark
|
|-
| Loss
| align=center| 7–2
| Maxim Grishin
| Decision (Majority)
| M-1 Challenge 32
| 
| align=center| 3
| align=center| 5:00
| Moscow, Russia
|
|-
| Win
| align=center| 7–1
| Wojciech Antczak
| Submission (rear-naked choke)
| Royal Arena 1
| 
| align=center| 1
| align=center| 2:15
| Hovedstaden, Denmark
|
|-
| Win
| align=center| 6–1
| Pierre Guillet
| Submission (arm-triangle choke)
| Fighter Gala 23
| 
| align=center| 3
| align=center| 3:55
| Copenhagen, Denmark
|
|-
| Win
| align=center| 5–1
| Ivan Gluhak
| KO (punch)
| Hard Fighting Championship 3
| 
| align=center| 2
| align=center| 3:12
| Martigny, Switzerland
|
|-
| Win
| align=center| 4–1
| Rowan Tol
| TKO (punches)
| Fighter Gala 16
| 
| align=center| 1
| align=center| 4:55
| Helsingør, Denmark
|
|-
| Loss
| align=center| 3–1
| Juha Saarinen
| Decision (unanimous)
| Adrenaline 4: The New Generation
| 
| align=center| 3
| align=center| 5:00
| Copenhagen, Denmark
|
|-
| Win
| align=center| 3–0
| Marek Pilar
| TKO (punches)
| Fighter Gala 9
| 
| align=center| 1
| align=center| 2:18
| Hovedstaden, Denmark
|
|-
| Win
| align=center| 2–0
| Michael Bender
| Submission (arm triangle choke)
| Adrenaline 2: Rise of the Champions
| 
| align=center| 1
| align=center| 1:42
| Denmark
|
|-
| Win
| align=center| 1–0
| Alex Landoni
| Submission (triangle choke)
| Adrenaline 1: Feel the Rush
| 
| align=center| 1
| align=center| 5:00
| Hvidovre, Denmark
|
|-

See also
List of current UFC fighters
List of male mixed martial artists

References

External links

Living people
1978 births
Light heavyweight mixed martial artists
Mixed martial artists utilizing boxing
Mixed martial artists utilizing wrestling
Mixed martial artists utilizing Brazilian jiu-jitsu
Danish male mixed martial artists
Danish practitioners of Brazilian jiu-jitsu
People awarded a black belt in Brazilian jiu-jitsu
Sportspeople from Copenhagen
Ultimate Fighting Championship male fighters